The India women's cricket team toured Australia between January and February 1991 to play a series of three Women's Test matches. Australia won the series 2–0.

Women's Test Series

1st WTest

2nd WTest

3rd WTest

References

External links 
 Tour home at ESPNcricinfo

1991 in Australian cricket
1991 in Indian cricket
India 1991
Australia 1991
1991 in women's cricket